Bolanle Ninalowo, also known as Nino, (born 7 May 1980) is a Nigerian actor and film producer.

Career
Before Ninalowo's attempt into the Nigerian movie industry he first worked as an accountant in a bank in the United States of America then upon relocating back to Nigeria he worked with Guaranty Trust Bank. Ninalowo's first attempt into the Nollywood Nigerian movie industry was as a movie producer. He produced his first movie titled Rebirth.

Personal life
Ninalowo has been married before, then separated, and has reconciled with his spouse with whom he has two children with, one male and the other female.

He is the cousin of Rukky Sanda, a Nigerian movie producer and actress. Nino converted from Islam to Christianity after he found a remedy to his troubles in the Bible which he says has become his life manual.

Selected filmography

 Husbands of Lagos 
Coming From Insanity 
Night Bus To Lagos 
Atlas 
A fire In The Rain 
30 Years A Virgin
 Iya iyawo
 The gateman
Road To Yesterday (2015)
Picture Perfect
Tiwa's Baggage (2017)
Akpe: Return of the Beast (2019)
Ratnik (2020)
Breaded Life (2021)
Crazy Grannies (2021)
13 Letters

Awards and nominations

References

External links
 Bolanle Ninalowo’s IMDb Page

Living people
1980 births
Nigerian male film actors
21st-century Nigerian male actors
Yoruba male actors
Male actors in Yoruba cinema
Nigerian expatriates in the United States
DeVry University alumni
Male actors from Lagos State
Nigerian male television actors
Nigerian television personalities
Nigerian film producers